Milena Gorska (born 11 January 2003) is a Polish rhythmic gymnast, member of the national group.

Career 
She entered the national team at 14 in 2017 when she was part of the junior group that took part in the European Championships in Budapest ending the All-Around in 11th place.

Two years later she was integrated in the senior group participating in the 2019 World Championships in Baku, finishing 18th in the All-Around, 15th with 5 balls and 17th with 3 hoops and 4 clubs. In 2021 she competed as an individual at two World Cup stages: Tashkent (40th in the All-Around, 46th with hoop, 37th with ball, 39th with clubs and 37th with ribbon) and Baku (47th in the All-Around, 40th with hoop, 46th with ball, 53rd with clubs and 43rd with ribbon).

Milena debuted in 2022, again as a member of the group, at the World Cup in Athens, winning bronze in the All-Around and with 3 ribbons and 2 balls and silver with 5 hoops. In May the group participated in the stage in Portimão winning bronze in the All-Around and with 3 ribbons and 2 balls and silver with 5 hoops. In June she and the group travelled to Pesaro, being 12th in the All-Around. Ten days later she competed at the 2022 European Championships in Tel Aviv, where Poland was 9th in the All-Around, 8th in the 5 hoops final and 10th with 3 ribbons + 2 balls. In September Gorska took part in the World Championships in Sofia along Julia Wojciechowska, Liwia Krzyzanowska, Madoka Przybylska, Magdalena Szewczuk and the individual Małgorzata Roszatycka, taking 13th place in the All-Around, 10th with 5 hoops and 14th with 3 ribbons + 2 balls.

References 

Living people
2003 births
Polish rhythmic gymnasts
People from Warsaw
Sportspeople from Warsaw